The Classical Gardens of Suzhou (Chinese: 苏州园林; pinyin: Sūzhōu yuánlín; Suzhounese (Wugniu): sou1-tseu1 yoe2-lin2) are a group of gardens in the city of Suzhou, in Jiangsu, China, which have been added to the UNESCO World Heritage List.

Spanning a period of almost one thousand years, from the Northern Song to the late Qing dynasties (11th-19th century), these gardens, most of them built by scholars, standardized many of the key features of classical Chinese garden design with constructed landscapes mimicking natural scenery of rocks, hills and rivers with strategically located pavilions and pagodas.

The elegant aesthetics and subtlety of these scholars' gardens and their delicate style and features are often imitated by various gardens in other parts of China, including the various Imperial Gardens, such as those in the Chengde Mountain Resort.  According to UNESCO, the gardens of Suzhou "represent the development of Chinese landscape garden design over more than two thousand years," and they are the "most refined form" of garden art.

These landscape gardens flourished in the mid-Ming to early-Qing dynasties, resulting in as much as 200 private gardens.  Today, there are 69 preserved gardens in Suzhou, and all of them are designated as protected "National Heritage Sites."  In 1997 and 2000, eight of the finest gardens in Suzhou along with one in the nearby ancient town of Tongli  were selected by UNESCO as a World Heritage Site to represent the art of Suzhou-style classical gardens.

Famous Suzhou garden designers include Zhang Liang, Ji Cheng, Ge Yuliang, and Chen Congzhou.

The gardens

Comprehensive monitoring plan
The site is monitored following a comprehensive monitoring plan and there is provision for both the routine maintenance and
programmed conservation projects for all of the gardens. The Suzhou Municipal Administrative Bureau of Gardens is responsible for this.

See also

Chinese garden
Five Peaks Garden

References

External links

 Classical Gardens of Suzhou - UNESCO World Heritage

 
Gardens in China
Buildings and structures in Suzhou
World Heritage Sites in China